Trieste's urban tramway system was operational from 1876 until 1970.

History

The horse-drawn network 
After the creation of the first horse-bus routes in 1860, mostly by the firm "Cimadori", the first horse-drawn tram followed in 1876, organized by “Società Triestina Tranway (STT)”, a Belgian-owned society, also known as “Triester Tramway Gesellschaft” or “Societé de Tramways de Trieste”. The first route, the “via Torrente-corsia Stadion-Boschetto” route, was inaugurated on March 30, 1876. In the later 1800s, the horse-drawn tram network was significantly increased. In 1900, its maximum expansion, the following routes were in service:

 Central RR Station (Südbahnhof)-Boschetto
 Central RR Station (Südbahnhof)-Sant'Andrea 
 route to Barcola
 route to Barriera Vecchia
 route to Giuseppina Square
 route to Punto Franco
 route to Bagno Fontana

Electrical operations begin 
The STT, in competition with other proposers, won a public tender to realize a network of electric trams in Trieste based on “Sprague system”, collecting electricity from overhead wires. The gauge of the track was of 1445 mm (4 ft, 8 7⁄8 in); the electricity supply was 600 V direct-current.
Consequently, on October 3, 1900, the first route between Barcola (a seaside resort  near the famous Miramar Castle of Maximilian of Austria) and Boschetto (a densely populated district of Trieste) was inaugurated: curiously, almost of the same itinerary of the first horse-drawn tramway.

Fourteen years after, at the onset of the First World War, the STT managed the following routes:

Electric lines:
 Boschetto – Servola
 Via Kandler – Sant'Andrea (K.K.st.B. Station)
 Barcola – Piazza Tommaseo
 Roiano – Via Sette Fontane
 Circle line

Horse-drawn line:
 Stazione Meridionale (Suedbahn Station) – Porto Vecchio

The routes were marked only by colored schedules with name of destination, with no number or letter; different colors identified the different routes. This was done to allow the illiterate to be able to read the map. Every car carried a “train number”, that distinguished any vehicle on the same route (this system – by little dox-matrix indicators – is still valid today, on the buses of “Trieste Trasporti”).

The Municipality enters tramway business 

Verify the success obtained by electric trams, the Municipality of Trieste decided to realise and to manage directly further routes, but the licensee STT taken a legal action in order to stand up for oneself. The Supreme Court of Vienna (until 1918, Trieste was part of the Austrian-Hungarian Empire), however, issued on May 19, 1910 a sentence in favour of Municipality. Therefore, on June 7, 1913 got under way the new route Piazza Goldoni-San Sabba, identified by the number “1” and managed directly by Municipality.:

Finished the World War I as a consequence of Rapallo Treaty (November 1920), Trieste became an Italian town. The new Administration of the Municipality, in order to raise the decent profit resulting from public transportation, decided to take it upon itself the whole net of STT, starting from 1921. Any route was enumerated.

The last route, the "11", opened on December 23, 1928, and ran from the center of the town to “Rion del Re”, a new neighborhood built in the hills in the south-east of Trieste. At the same date, the network reached to the maximum extension, with 124 trams and 86 trailers in service and with 11 routes covered about 45 km (28 miles):

 1 - San Sabba-San Giacomo-Stazione Centrale  
 2 - Boschetto-Campo Marzio-Servola  
 3 - Boschetto- Stazione Campo Marzio  
 4 - Piazza Garibaldi-Campo Marzio-Arsenale  
 5 - Piazza Perugino-Roiano  
 6 - Piazza Goldoni-Barcola  
 7 - Boschetto-Stazione Centrale  
 8 - Stazione Centrale-Campo Marzio  
 9 -  S.Giovanni-Campi Elisi  
 10 - Via Economo-Via Fabio Severo   
 11 -  Piazza Verdi-Rion del Re 
 
In 1934 the Municipality decided to unify the public utilities and create the A.C.E.G.A.T., acronym that means “Council Society for Electricity, Gas, Water and Tramway”. At the same time, 48 modern trams (401-448 batches) with high capacity entered in service, in place of the 1900 little trams (101-160 batch) that were retired.

Decline 

The decline of the trams quietly began in 1935, with the conversion  of the route “10” into a bus line, and later into a trolleybus line. Before World War II, the transportation network of A.C.E.G.A.T. consisted of nine tram routes and three trolleybus routes, plus occasional services carried out by buses.

The war, even with its air raids, hardly damaged plants and most of the rolling stock of the A.C.E.G.A.T. remained intact. In June 1945, Trieste was occupied by allied troops that remained there for nine years and created the Free Territory of Trieste. During the refurbishment of the tramway system, many services were conducted by equipped Allied Army lorries (trucks).

The tram, though having reached a good level of quality, was less economic than the trolleybus or motor bus and showed high-grade of performance only on level lines, with flowing itineraries and a high number of passengers; that being so, A.C.E.G.A.T. decided to modified the “mix” between trams and trolleybus, increasing decisively the latter. Around 1952, routes "1", "5", and "11" were converted into trolleybus routes; route "4" was terminated; and routes "6" and "7" were merged. Two night services were created ("31" and "32").

After the “Trolleybus Conversion”, the tram system consisted of the following routes:

 2 – Boschetto-Servola
 3 - San Giovanni-Campo Marzio
 6 - San Giovanni-Barcola
 8 - Roiano-Campo Marzio
 9 - San Giovanni-Campi Elisi
 31 - San Giovanni-Piazza Goldoni-Servola (only overnight service)
 32 - Barcola-Piazza Goldoni-Campo Marzio (only overnight service)

Nearly all of the two-axle trams and countless trailers were scrapped. In the summer time, as Trieste is a seaside resort, the route “6” (piazza Goldoni - Barcola) was created and the routes “3” and “8” took a detour to the beach resorts.

In Italy, in the early 1960s, the economic situation of the public transportation authorities began to fail. Municipalities were coerced to fill the balances of the transportation companies that grew poorer year after year. In order to significantly reduce the costs, it was considered fit to replace the conductors with automatic ticket machines: for many factors, A.C.E.G.A.T. considered these machines unfitting with tram and trolleybus operations. Therefore, the Municipality decided to convert the entire network to bus operations within 1970. In the evening of March 31, 1970, the last urban tram ran in Trieste on route “9”.

The last trolleybus ran in 1975. On July 1, 1977 A.C.E.G.A.T. merged into “Azienda Consorziale Trasporti” and ceased to exist. Today in Trieste, the “Trenovia di Opicina”, a peculiar 1902 extra-urban tram (see map), is the only remaining relic of Trieste's tram network.

Rolling stock

Trailers

Trams

Gallery

Bibliography  

 Giorgio Grisilla, Andrea Di Matteo, "Trieste e i suoi tram" article published in "I Treni" n. 222, ETR Editrice, Salò (BS), January 2001, pp. 29–33.
 Guido Botteri (edited by), "I trasporti a Trieste. Dalla Società triestina Tramway all'Azienda Consorziale Trasporti", Nuova Del Bianco, Udine, 1982.
 Roberto Carollo, Leandro Steffè, "Il servizio tranviario nella città di Trieste" chapter in "Il museo ferroviario di Trieste Campo Marzio", Luglio Editore, Trieste, 2007, pp. 106–109, .

See also 

Trolleybuses in Trieste
Trieste-Opicina Tramway
List of town tramway systems in Italy

References

Trieste
History of Trieste
Tram transport in Italy